Castle Dale is a city in northwestern Emery County, Utah, United States. The population was 1,630 at the 2010 census. It is the county seat of Emery County.

History
The first settlement at Castle Dale was made in 1879.

Geography
Castle Dale lies on the north side of Cottonwood Creek, a tributary of the San Rafael River, in Castle Valley.

Utah State Route 10 passes through the center of town, leading northeast  to Price and southwest  to Interstate 70.

Demographics

As of the census of 2000 there were 1,657 people, 508 households, and 420 families residing in the city. The population density was 887.5 people per square mile (342.1/km2). There were 618 housing units at an average density of 331.0 per square mile (127.6/km2). The racial makeup of the city was 95.47% White, 0.06% African American, 0.66% Native American, 0.54% Asian, 0.18% Pacific Islander, 0.91% from other races, and 2.17% from two or more races. Hispanic or Latino of any race were 2.17% of the population.

There were 508 households, out of which 49.2% had children under the age of 18 living with them, 72.6% were married couples living together, 7.1% had a female householder with no husband present, and 17.3% were non-families. 15.6% of all households were made up of individuals, and 7.9% had someone living alone who was 65 years of age or older. The average household size was 3.22, and the average family size was 3.60.

In the city, the population was spread out, with 37.2% under 18, 9.7% from 18 to 24, 23.5% from 25 to 44, 21.5% from 45 to 64, and 8.1% who were 65 years of age or older. The median age was 28 years. For every 100 females, there were 105.8 males. For every 100 females aged 18 and over, there were 100.4 males.

The median income for a household in the city was $44,185, and the median income for a family was $48,603. Males had a median income of $40,515 versus $20,294 for females. The per capita income for the city was $14,175. About 6.7% of families and 9.5% of the population were below the poverty line, including 12.4% of those under age 18 and 5.6% of those aged 65 or over.

Climate
Castle Dale has a fairly typical Intermountain West cool semi-arid climate (Köppen BSk). Summer afternoons are hot with intense sunshine, although mornings are pleasantly cool, while winter mornings are frigid even though all but 14.2 afternoons top freezing in an average year. Precipitation, owing to the rain shadows of mountains to the south (blocking monsoonal storms in summer) and west (blocking Pacific storms in winter), is light throughout the year, although there is a slight peak in late summer.

Education
Emery County School District operates public schools in the county.

See also

 List of cities and towns in Utah

References

 Emery County Daughters of Utah Pioneers. Castle Valley: A History of Emery County. 1949.
 Powell, Allan Kent. Emery County: Reflections on Its Past and Future. 1979.
 Emery County Historical Society. Emery County 1880-1980. 1981.

External links

 Castle Dale City at Emery County official website
 Emery County Progress

Cities in Utah
County seats in Utah
Cities in Emery County, Utah
Populated places established in 1877
1877 establishments in Utah Territory